Harvey John Long (September 11, 1906 – October 8, 1952) played in the National Football League for the Chicago Bears and Frankford Yellow Jackets in 1929 and 1930 as a tackle and guard. He played at the collegiate level at the University of Detroit Mercy.

Biography
Long was born on September 11, 1906 in Sheboygan, Wisconsin. He died on October 8, 1952, in South Haven, Michigan following an attack of pneumonia.

See also
List of Chicago Bears players
List of Frankford Yellow Jackets players

References

People from St. Croix County, Wisconsin
Players of American football from Wisconsin
Chicago Bears players
Detroit Titans football players
Frankford Yellow Jackets players
1906 births
1952 deaths